Estahban (also Romanized as Estahbān and Eşţahbān; formerly, Eşţahbānāt, Estehbanat, Istehbānāt, Istahbanát and Shahr-e Eşţahbānāt; also formerly known as Savānāt) is a city and capital of Estahban County, Fars Province, Iran.

The area about Estahban is very fertile, being the largest producer of dried fig, saffron, grain, cotton, walnut, almond, grapes and other fruits in the Middle East. Estahban has been the most famous provider of figs to the world. It is also one of the biggest producers of saffron. Its original name Estahbanat was changed to Estahban in 1970.

Estahbanat was formerly called by the Farsname Naseri. It is rooted from Pahlavi word of "Seteh" and suffix "Ban" which mean place for keeping grapes.

Demographics 
Language and ethnic groups

The majority of the people of Estahban are Persians, and they speak Persian with the Shirazi accent, not the Persian accent of Tehran.

Religion

The majority of people in Estahban are Muslims.

Population

According to the Iranian Census of 2011, the population of Estahban is 66,172 people from 12,714 families, which includes 32,654 women and 33,518 men.

Geography 

Estahban is located at 29.1291° N, 54.358° E and surrounded by Bakhtagan Lake from the north, by Fars township from the south and by Shiraz and Darab from the west. Its average elevation from sea level is about 1767 m.

Climate

Estahban is a dry City, with a yearly precipitation amount of 224 millimeters, with summer temperatures frequently about 28.1 °C (104 °F) in blazing sunshine with no humidity.

Economy 

Because of fertile soil, economy in Estahban is mostly based on agriculture and consequently significant portion of population is employed in agriculture industries. Estahban dried figs are exported all over the world.

Dry Fig 
Growing rain-fed and organically, having sweeter taste, drying naturally on tree and many health benefits make this fig unique.

There is no process for drying this product. Figs become dried by sun lights on the tree and then fall on the earth. Farmers collect them to warehouse to classify them.

Notables from Estahban 
 Nezam Al Olama Estahbanati
 Nezameddin Faghih

References

Populated places in Estahban County
Cities in Fars Province